This is a list of the Landgravine, Electress and Grand Duchess of Hesse, the consorts of the Landgrave of Hesse and its successor states; and finally of the Electors and Grand Dukes of Hesse.

Hesse

Upper Hesse (Marburg) 
The only Landgravine of Upper Hesse was Anna of Katzenelnbogen (1443–1494) who married Henry III in 1458. One could say that Anna of Brunswick was a Landgravine of Upper Hesse when it was united with Lower Hesse after 1500.

Hesse-Kassel

Hesse-Marburg

Hesse-Rheinfels

Hesse-Darmstadt

Electorate of Hesse

Grand Duchy of Hesse

See also
List of rulers of Hesse

External links
 The History Files: Rulers of Hesse

 List of Hessian consorts
 
Hessian
Hessian
Hesse